John Gilbert Mathias Jr. (born January 26, 1949) is an American sailor. He competed in the Flying Dutchman event at the 1976 Summer Olympics.

References

External links
 
 

1949 births
Living people
American male sailors (sport)
Olympic sailors of the United States
Sailors at the 1976 Summer Olympics – Flying Dutchman
Sportspeople from Buffalo, New York